October 2017 Mogadishu bombings may refer to:

14 October 2017 Mogadishu bombings
28 October 2017 Mogadishu attacks